John Metcalfe Coulson (born 13 December 1910 in Dudley, died 6 January 1990)
was a British chemical engineering academic particularly known for co-writing a textbook on chemical engineering with Jack Richardson (published in 1954), which became an established series of texts now known as Coulson & Richardson's Chemical Engineering.

John Coulson was the twin brother of Charles Alfred Coulson, the noted chemist. Their father was Alfred Coulson (who became Principal of Dudley Technical College) and their mother was Annie Sincere Hancock, a school headmistress.

He went to Clifton College. He did his first degree at Christ's College, Cambridge, then a postgraduate course in Chemical Engineering at Imperial College followed by research, achieving a PhD in 1935.  He joined the academic staff, achieving the status of Reader.  In 1954 he became the first head of the Department of Chemical Engineering at Newcastle University, where he remained until his retirement in 1975, apart from a secondment to Heriot-Watt University during its formation of a separate department of chemical engineering.

Coulson married twice, first to Dora (died 1961) with whom he had two sons, Anthony and Simon, and then in 1965 to Christine, who survived him.

He was awarded the George E. Davis Medal of the Institution of Chemical Engineers in 1973,  and he received an Honorary Doctorate from Heriot-Watt University in the same year.

References
COULSON, Prof. John Metcalfe, Who Was Who, A & C Black, 1920–2008; online edn, Oxford University Press, Dec 2012

British chemical engineers
Engineering academics
Chemical engineering academics
British textbook writers
People from Dudley
People educated at Clifton College
Alumni of Christ's College, Cambridge
Alumni of Imperial College London
Academics of Newcastle University
1910 births
1990 deaths